The Hotel Princess Mundo Imperial is a resort hotel located in Acapulco, Guerrero, Mexico.  The hotel features eight tennis courts, including a 6,000-seat stadium court.  It is the host of the Abierto Mexicano Telcel, an annual event on the ATP Tour and the WTA Tour.

History and architecture

The hotel was built by billionaire Daniel K. Ludwig and designed by William Rudolph and Leonides Guadarrama to resemble an ancient Aztec pyramid. It opened in 1971 as the Acapulco Princess. In the summer of 1982 a third tower was added.

In 1998 Canadian Pacific Hotels purchased the Princess Hotels situated in Mexico, Arizona, Bermuda and Barbados; and during October 1999 the administrators of the company signed an agreement with Fairmont Hotels, creating the company Fairmont Hotels & Resorts. The hotel was renamed the Fairmont Acapulco Princess. It remained part of the Fairmont chain until September 2015.

Built in the form of an ancient Aztec pyramid, the hotel contains 1,011 rooms.

The resort features four freshwater pools with waterfalls and one saltwater pool, all overlooking Revolcadero Beach; a golf course; and eight outdoor and two indoor tennis courts.

Howard Hughes

The Acapulco Princess was the final residence of Howard Hughes. On April 5, 1976, Hughes was carried out of his penthouse suite of the hotel, unconscious, and carried onto the chartered jet (N855W). He died shortly thereafter, en route to Houston, Texas.

Administrative dispute

Currently the hotel administration is under a legal dispute. The current owners of the Acapulco Princess, Grupo Autofin, removed Fairmont's staff and installed their own administration. The Hotel is no longer under the operation of Fairmont, references to the Fairmont brand have been removed from the installation, and Fairmont no longer lists this hotel as part of their properties in their webpage. The Hotel operations were not disrupted due to the takeover.

See also

 List of hotels in Mexico
 List of companies of Mexico
 List of tennis stadiums by capacity

References

Tennis venues in Mexico
Hotels in Mexico
Buildings and structures in Guerrero
Tourist attractions in Guerrero
Acapulco
Hotels established in 1971
Hotel buildings completed in 1971